Philip Janaro (born December 23, 1942) is a former American football coach.

Coaching career
Janaro was the 28th and then later returned to be the 32nd and head football coach at The Apprentice School located in Newport News, Virginia and he held that position for nine seasons, from 1985 until 1987 and then returning from 2002 until 2007.
His coaching record at Apprentice was 42 wins, 35 losses.

References

External links
The Apprentice School profile

1942 births
Living people
The Apprentice Builders football coaches
Bethel Royals football coaches
Bridgeport Purple Knights football coaches
Davidson Wildcats football coaches
Illinois Fighting Illini football coaches
William & Mary Tribe football coaches
High school football coaches in New York (state)
People from Hawthorne, New Jersey